The men's 20 kilometres walk event at the 2007 World Championships in Athletics took place on August 26, 2007 in the streets of Osaka, Japan.

The event saw some controversy as Paquillo Fernández, who finished second after overtaking Hatem Ghoula in the final straight, was disqualified after the race for lifting. However, following an appeal by the Spanish team the same day, video evidence was examined and Fernández was found to have walked in compliance with the rules. He was thus re-awarded the silver medal.

Jefferson Pérez became the first race walker to win three World Championship gold medals. Also, Fernández won his third consecutive silver medal. Hatem Ghoula became the first African race walker to win a World Championship medal.

Medallists

Abbreviations
All times shown are in hours:minutes:seconds

Records

Final ranking

See also
Athletics at the 2007 Pan American Games – Men's 20 kilometres walk

References
Full results - IAAF.org
Event report - IAAF.org
 Die Leichtathletik-Statistik-Seite

20 kilometres walk
Racewalking at the World Athletics Championships